THG plc, formerly The Hut Group, is a British e-commerce retail company headquartered at Manchester Airport, England. It sells own-brand and third-party cosmetics, dietary supplements, luxury goods, and licensed and personalised products online. It provides an end-to-end e-commerce service to third parties through its Ingenuity division. As of 2022, the company operates 18 fulfilment centres which ship to 195 territories worldwide.

History
The company was founded in Manchester in 2004 with a £500,000 investment by Matt Moulding and John Gallemore. The company sold CDs and DVDs online before creating white-label web stores for large physical retailers, including Asda, Argos Entertainment, Tesco and WHSmith. It operated a warehouse in Guernsey, allowing customers to avoid paying VAT on items priced below £18.

The creation of the iPhone in 2007 undermined this business model and The Hut Group began acquiring internet retailers and moving them into the group's existing systems and warehouses. The company purchased Zavvi in 2009, Lookfantastic in 2010 and Myprotein in 2011. The group focused on beauty and lifestyle products because of the large margins and potential for international scaling.

Investors included Terry Leahy, a former chief executive of Tesco, and Stuart Rose, the chairman of Ocado. In 2014, the company sold a 19.2% stake to KKR, while Balderton Capital, a technology investor, held an identical stake. BlackRock invested £138 million in February 2016, and Sofina announced an undisclosed equity stake in May 2016. In August 2017, Sky News reported that Old Mutual Global Investors had made their first private equity investment in The Hut Group. In 2017, The Hut Group was valued at more than £2.5 billion making it one of the most valuable private companies in the United Kingdom, and one of the UK's unicorn companies.

On 16 September 2020, THG floated on the London Stock Exchange, the largest IPO on the LSE since 2013. The share price rose in value by 25% on the first day of trading, generating £920m for the company and £961m for the company's owners. After the flotation, Moulding received one of the biggest payouts in UK corporate history of at least £830m in shares.

However, by early October 2021, THG's share price had fallen by more than 60% since the start of the year. On 12 October 2021, the company held a capital markets day to unveil its sustainability strategy with investors. Afterwards, shares fell by 35%, wiping £1.8 billion off THG's value.

Following criticism of the company's governance arrangements, Charles Allen replaced Moulding as chairman in March 2022, with Moulding remaining CEO.

Products and services

Beauty
THG Beauty sells own-brand and third party cosmetics, including skincare, haircare, makeup and fragrances.

It both owns brands (Ameliorate, Christophe Robin, ESPA, Eyeko, Grow Gorgeous, Illamasqua, Mio and Perricone MD) and its own web stores (Beauty Expert, Cult Beauty, Dermstore, HQhair, Lookfantastic, Mankind, RY, SkinCareRx and SkinStore). Each web store is localised to different territories, including localised pricing, promotions, content, marketing, influencers, customer service, couriers and payment options. It offers two subscription services through Lookfantastic and Glossybox which are designed to introduce consumers to new THG products.

The division has its own product development and manufacturing facilities for both own-brands and third parties.

Ingenuity
Ingenuity is a service targeted at consumer brand owners seeking to expand or transition from physical retail stores into direct-to-consumer e-commerce in one or more territories.

Ingenuity Infrastructure allows individual components to be purchased, whereas Ingenuity Commerce is an end-to-end e-commerce service encompassing all services on a longer term contract. Ingenuity Commerce customers include Homebase and Hotel Chocolat.

Nutrition
Myprotein is a bodybuilding supplement brand which has developed into a family of brands; Myvitamins, Myvegan, MyPRO and MP Activewear. Command and BeNu launched in 2021 targeting the nootropics and meal replacement markets respectively. THG also owns Exante, a weight loss brand formerly called IdealShape.

Like the Beauty division, THG Nutrition is vertically integrated with its own localised web stores, product development and manufacturing facilities which also service third parties.

OnDemand
THG OnDemand sells entertainment products and subscription services of clothing, gadgets and vinyl figurines, with a particular focus on licensing arrangements with global publishing houses and personalisation.

Web stores include IWOOT, My Geek Box, Pop In A Box, Very Neko and Zavvi. The division also includes the cycling web stores, ProBikeKit and Morvélo, and the film distributor, Arrow Films.

The division also operates several brands which sell licensed designs exclusively on Zavvi, including DUST! (gaming and film memorabilia), Akedo Footwear (high-top shoes), Milliner (baseball caps) and MOTH Audio (headphones).

Other
Two smaller divisions are grouped together.

THG Luxury includes the designer clothing, accessories and homeware web stores, Allsole, Coggles, MyBag and The Hut.

THG Experience consists of three event spaces (King Street Townhouse Hotel, Great John Street Hotel, and Hale Country Club & Spa) for hosting influencer and brand events.

Facilities and locations
THG's head office is at the purpose built ICON Technology Campus at Manchester Airport which opened in 2021. THG Studios, the group's content creation unit, is also based there as well as offices and an automated warehouse which uses technology from AutoStore, a Norwegian robot technology company.

In 2020, THG exchanged contracts to build a new 1m sq ft global headquarters at Airport City Manchester to be called THQ. It was due for completion in 2022 but work had not yet begun by October 2022.

As of 2022, THG operates 9 production facilities and 18 fulfilment centres which ship to 195 territories worldwide. THG Ingenuity Cloud Services also operates over 50 data centres worldwide.

Acquisitions
THG has pursued an acquisition strategy of mainly taking full ownership of e-commerce businesses in a variety of retail sectors and putting the websites onto its proprietary e-commerce platform, Ingenuity.

Controversies

Litigation
In 2014, The Hut Group sued Oliver Cookson for £15 million, alleging that he and his off-shore trust had overstated the profits of Myprotein prior to its acquisition by The Hut Group in 2011. Cookson counter sued for £12.7 million claiming a breach of warranty and fraudulent misrepresentation. The matter went to the High Court in London in October 2014 and, after a month-long trial, judgement was given by William Blair in November 2014 awarding Cookson an overall net result win of £6.5m in damages.

At the costs hearing in December 2014, the judge awarded a payment of just under £7.5 million to be made by The Hut Group to Cookson and the Trust in respect of all of the claims and counterclaims in the action and one third of the costs incurred by Cookson and the Trust.

Cookson and the Trust appealed the court's decision to award The Hut Groups damages. The court of appeal dismissed the appeal on 22 March 2016.

Property ownership
In January 2021, investors raised questions over the company's property deal with its CEO and co-founder, Matt Moulding. Moulding sold himself many of the company's property assets, which he then is reported to rent back to THG for £19m annually.

References 

 
Online retailers of the United Kingdom
Companies based in Manchester
Retail companies established in 2004
British companies established in 2004
Retail companies of England
Internet properties established in 2004
Software companies established in 2004
Software companies of England
Companies listed on the London Stock Exchange
2020 initial public offerings
Cloud computing providers
E-commerce software